Rasputin: Dark Servant of Destiny is a 1996 biographical historical drama television film which chronicles the last four years (1912–16) of Grigori Rasputin's stint as a healer to Alexei Nikolaevich, Tsarevich of Russia; the heir apparent to the Russian throne as well as the only son of Tsar Nicholas II of Russia and Empress Alexandra Feodorovna; who suffered from hemophilia. The film is narrated in the first person by Alexei.

Plot
In 1991, the remains of Russian Tsar Nicholas II and his family (except for Alexei and Maria) are discovered. The voice of Nicholas's young son, Tsarevich Alexei Nikolaevich, narrates the remainder of the story.

1883 Western Siberia, a young Grigori Rasputin is asked by his father and a group of men to perform magic. Rasputin has a vision and denounces one of the men as a horse thief. Although his father initially slaps him for making such an accusation, Rasputin watches as the man is chased outside and beaten.

Twenty years later, Rasputin sees a vision of the Virgin Mary, prompting him to become a priest. Rasputin quickly becomes famous, with people, even a bishop, begging for his blessing.

Meanwhile, in St. Petersburg, Alexei is confined to his bed suffering from severe bruising to his leg caused by Hemophilia B, a disease that prevents proper blood clotting. Nicholas has so far kept Alexei's illness a secret from the Russian people. Eugene Botkin, the family's court physician, has been unable to help the boy. Alexei's mother, Tsarina Alexandra Feodorovna asks to see a spiritual healer, and is recommended to call upon Rasputin.

Rasputin is summoned to the Tsar's palace and brought before Alexei. Rasputin startles Nicholas and Alexandra by asking Alexei about his leg, despite neither of them having told him of Alexei's affliction. Rasputin soothes Alexei with images of sailing whilst he places his hand on the boy's leg. Rasputin limps away, causing Alexandra to believe he has absorbed Alexei's pain into his own body. Nicholas asks Rasputin how he knew about Alexei's leg, and Rasputin responds that the Virgin Mary told him and sent him to heal Alexei; Nicholas remains skeptical.

The next morning, Alexei awakens in perfect health and proclaims that Rasputin has healed him with magic. Dr. Botkin insists that it was a treatment he started using on Alexei the week before. Alexandra visits Rasputin to thank him. Rasputin questions Alexandra's faith in God, placing the blame for Alexei's disease on her weak prayers. Alexandra asks that Rasputin move in with the family and gives him his own chamber in the palace.

Rasputin begins to become acquainted with Nicholas's daughters, Olga, Tatiana, Maria, and Anastasia; worrying Nicholas after he hears rumors of Rasputin's womanizing and flings with prostitutes. Nicholas soon asks Rasputin to leave the palace.

Later, Alexei suffers a severe nosebleed and Alexandra begs for Rasputin to be brought back to heal her son again. Rasputin returns and heals Alexei, converting Nicholas in the process, although Dr. Botkin remains convinced that Rasputin is merely hypnotizing Alexei.

Dr. Botkin vents his suspicions to Russian Prime Minister Pyotr Stolypin, who sends men to spy on Rasputin.
A woman named Princess Marisa visits Rasputin, asking to be blessed. Rasputin tells her that before one can ask for absolution one must sin, and convinces her to have sex with him. Stolypin's spies watch this happen.

Stolypin approaches Nicholas with his findings, and with news that rumors are circulating throughout Russia regarding Rasputin's stay at the palace and closeness to the Imperial Family, particularly Alexandra. That night, a drunken Rasputin makes some obscene comments about the Imperial Family and is brought before the Tsar. Nicholas banishes Rasputin from St. Petersburg, and Rasputin prophesies a terrible future for Russia and Stolypin's own assassination. A month later Nicholas is informed of the onset of World War I, and Stolypin is shot and killed.

Alexei suffers another severe bleeding, prompting Alexandra and Nicholas to call Rasputin. Rasputin heals Alexei over the phone, re-confirming Nicholas's faith in the healer. Rasputin is forgiven and returns to the palace.

As millions of Russian soldiers die in World War I, citizens place the blame on Alexandra and Rasputin. Rasputin stops seeing the Virgin Mary, causing Alexandra and his fellow monks to desert him.

A group of men led by Prince Felix Yusupov decide to murder Rasputin and invite him to the Yusupov palace in December 1916. Felix feeds Rasputin cakes and wine laced with lethal amounts of cyanide, but is horrified when it seems to have no effect. Felix then shoots Rasputin, who still does not die. Rasputin stumbles through the courtyard to the palace gates before being shot four more times, finally collapsing and dying. His body is thrown from a bridge into the icy Malaya Nevka River.
 
Alexandra reads a note left behind by Rasputin, revealing his prior knowledge that he would be murdered, and that should the murderers be nobles, the Imperial Family would die within two years.

In 1917, with Russia on the verge of collapse due to the war, Nicholas is forced to abdicate as Tsar and is sent into exile with his family. The Imperial Family is executed in Yekaterinburg on 17 July 1918.

Cast
 Alan Rickman as Grigori Rasputin
 Greta Scacchi as Tsarina Alexandra
 Ian McKellen as Tsar Nicholas II
 Freddie Finlay as Tsarevich Alexei
 David Warner as Dr. Botkin
 John Wood as Prime Minister Stolypin
 James Frain as Prince Felix Yusupov
 Ian Hogg as Purishkevich
 Sheila Ruskin as Princess Marisa
 Peter Jeffrey as Bishop Hermogones
 Julian Curry as Dr. Lazovert

Historical accuracy
Russian Prime Minister Pyotr Stolypin is shown to have been killed in 1913, on the occasion of the Romanov dynasty's Tercentenary celebration, and just prior to the outbreak of World War I, while he was actually killed in 1911.

The Russian Orthodox Choir which sings the litany at the Tercentenary liturgy also seems to be a choir of the 1990s, since the Patriarch Alexei is mentioned by name. The Patriarchate in fact did not exist under the later Romanovs, having been abolished by Peter the Great.

Awards and nominations
Rasputin: Dark Servant of Destiny won a Golden Globe for Best Mini-Series or Motion Picture made for TV. Alan Rickman, starring as Rasputin, won an Emmy (along with Greta Scacchi playing Tsarina Alexandra) and a Golden Globe for his work in this movie.  Ian McKellen, playing Tsar Nicholas II, won a Golden Globe for Best Supporting Actor, and was nominated an Emmy for Best Supporting Actor.

External links

 

American television films
American biographical films
1996 television films
1996 films
1990s biographical films
Films directed by Uli Edel
Films shot in Hungary
Best Miniseries or Television Movie Golden Globe winners
Films about Grigori Rasputin
Cultural depictions of Nicholas II of Russia
Cultural depictions of Grand Duchess Anastasia Nikolaevna of Russia
1990s American films